

T

Ta – Te 

 

 

Tacharanite (Y: 1961) 9.HA.75   
Tachyhydrite (Y: 1856) 3.BB.35    (IUPAC: calcium dimagnesium hexachloride dodecahydrate)
Tadzhikite-(Ce) (hellandite: IMA1969-042) 9.DK.20   
Taenite (alloy: 1861) 1.AE.10    (IUPAC: γ-(nickel,iron) alloy)
Taikanite (IMA1984-051) 9.DH.25    (IUPAC: barium distrontium dimanganese(III) dioxy dodecaoxytetrasilicate)
Taimyrite (alloy: IMA1973-065) 1.AG.15    (IUPAC: nona(palladium,platinum) tricopper tetrastannide)
Tainiolite (mica: 1901) 9.EC.15    (IUPAC: potassium lithium dimagnesium decaoxotetrasilicate difluoride)
Taipingite-(Ce) (IMA2018-123a) 9.0  [no] [no]
Takanawaite-(Y) (fluorite: IMA2011-099) 4.0  [no] [no] (IUPAC: yttrium tantalum tetraoxide)
Takanelite (IMA1970-034) 4.FL.40   
Takedaite (IMA1993-049) 6.AA.40    (IUPAC: tricalcium hexaoxodiborate)
Takéuchiite (orthopinakiolite: IMA1980-018) 6.AB.40    (IUPAC: dimagnesium manganese(III) dioxo(trioxoborate))
Takovite (hydrotalcite: IMA1977 s.p., 1955) 5.DA.50    (IUPAC: hexanickel dialuminium carbonate hexadecahydroxide tetrahydrate)
Talc (talc: old) 9.EC.05    (IUPAC: trimagnesium decaoxotetrasilicate dihydroxyl)
Talmessite (fairfieldite: IMA1985 s.p., 1960) 8.CG.05    (IUPAC: dicalcium magnesium diarsenate dihydrate)
Talnakhite (chalcopyrite: IMA1967-014) 2.CB.10b    (IUPAC: nonacopper octairon hexadecasulfide)
Tamaite (IMA1999-011) 9.EG.30   [no]
Tamarugite (Y: 1889) 7.CC.10    (IUPAC: sodium aluminium disulfate hexahydrate)
Tamboite (tellurite: IMA2016-059) 4.0  [no] [no] (IUPAC: triiron(III) hydro diwater sulfate tri(trioxotellurate(IV)) (dihydroxotellurate(IV)) triwater)
Tamuraite (sulfide: IMA2020-098)  [no] [no] (IUPAC: pentairidium decairon hexadecasulfide)
Tancaite-(Ce) (IMA2009-097) 7.GB.50  [no] [no] (IUPAC: iron cerium trimolybdate trihydrate)
Tancoite (IMA1979-045) 8.BG.15    (IUPAC: hydrogen lithium disodium [aluminium hydro diphosphate])
Taneyamalite (IMA1977-042) 9.DH.65   
Tangdanite (tyrolite: IMA2011-096) 8.0  [no] [no] (IUPAC: tetracalcium octadecacopper octarsenate sulfate octadecahydroxide octadecahydrate) Note: approval for the name 'fuxiaotuite' was withdrawn by the IMA-CNMNC.
Tangeite (adelite: IMA1992 s.p., 1926) 8.BH.35    (IUPAC: calcium copper hydro vanadate)
Taniajacoite (ruizite: IMA2014-107) 9.B?.  [no] [no] (IUPAC: strontium calcium dimanganese(III) undecaoxotetrasilicate tetrahydroxyl dihydrate)
Tanohataite (pectolite: IMA2007-019) 9.0  [no]  (IUPAC: lithium dimanganese octaoxotrisilicate hydroxyl)
Tantalaeschynite-(Y) (aeschynite: IMA1969-043) 4.DF.05    (IUPAC: yttrium di(tantalum,titanium,niobium) hexaoxide)
Tantalcarbide (carbide: 1909) 1.BA.20    (IUPAC: tantalum carbide)
Tantalite (columbite, tantalite) 4.DB.35 (IUPAC: (metal) ditantalum hexaoxide)
Tantalite-(Fe) (IMA2007 s.p., 1836) 4.DB.35   
Tantalite-(Mg) (IMA2002-018) 4.DB.35   
Tantalite-(Mn) (IMA2007 s.p., 1887) 4.DB.35   
Tantalowodginite (IMA2017-095) 4.0  [no] [no]
Tanteuxenite-(Y) (columbite: IMA1987 s.p., 1929) 4.DG.05    (IUPAC: yttrium di(tantalum,niobium,titanium) hexa(oxo,hydro))
Tantite (IMA1982-066) 4.EA.05    (IUPAC: ditantalum pentaoxide)
Tapiaite (IMA2014-024) 8.0  [no] [no] (IUPAC: pentacalcium dialuminium tetrahydro tetrarsenate dodecahydrate)
Tapiolite (tapiolite) 4.DB.10 (IUPAC: (metal) ditantalum hexaoxide)
Tapiolite-(Fe) (IMA2007 s.p., IMA83-A, 1863) 4.DB.10   
Tapiolite-(Mn) (IMA1983-005) 4.DB.10   
Taramellite (Y: 1908) 9.CE.20   
Taramite [Na-Ca-amphibole: IMA2012 s.p., IMA1997 s.p., 1925] 9.DE.20    (IUPAC: sodium (sodium calcium) (trimagnesium dialuminium) (dialuminium hexasilicate) dihydroxyl docosaoxy)
Taranakite (Y: 1866) 8.CH.25    (IUPAC: tripotassium pentaluminium hexa(hydroxophosphate) diphosphate octadecahydrate)
Tarapacáite (Y: 1878) 7.FA.05    (IUPAC: potassium chromate)
Tarbagataite (astrophyllite: IMA2010-048) 9.D?.  [no] 
Tarbuttite (Y: 1907) 8.BB.35    (IUPAC: dizinc hydro phosphate)
Tarkianite (IMA2003-004) 2.DB.30    (IUPAC: (copper,iron) tetra(rhenium,molybdenum) octasulfide)
Taseqite (eudialyte: IMA2002-055) 9.CO.10   [no]
Tashelgite (IMA2010-017) 4.0  [no] [no] (IUPAC: calcium magnesium iron(II) nonaluminium hydro hexadecaoxide)
Tassieite (wicksite: IMA2005-051) 8.CF.05    (IUPAC: sodium dicalcium trimagnesium diiron(II) iron(III) hexaphosphate dihydrate)
Tatarinovite (ettringite: IMA2015-055) 4.0  [no] [no] (IUPAC: tricalcium aluminium sulfate hexahydro [tetrahydroborate] dodecahydrate)
Tatarskite (IMA1967 s.p., 1963) 7.DG.25    (IUPAC: hexacalcium dimagnesium tetrahydro tetrachloro disulfate dicarbonate heptahydrate)
Tatyanaite (alloy: IMA1995-049) 1.AG.15    (IUPAC: nona(platinum,palladium) tricopper tetrastannide)
Tausonite (oxide perovskite: IMA1982-077) 4.CC.35    (IUPAC: strontium titanium trioxide)
Tavagnascoite (IMA2014-099) 7.B?.  [no] [no] (IUPAC: tetraoxidetetrabismuth dihydro sulfate)
Tavorite (titanite: 1954) 8.BB.05    (IUPAC: lithium iron(III) hydro phosphate)
Tazheranite (fluorite: IMA1969-008) 4.DL.10    (IUPAC: (zirconium,titanium,calcium) (oxide,vacancy))
Tazieffite (IMA2008-012) 2.0   [no]
Tazzoliite (pyrochlore: IMA2011-018) 8.0  [no] [no]
Teallite (Y: 1904) 2.CD.05    (IUPAC: lead tin disulfide)
Tedhadleyite (IMA2001-035) 3.DD.40   [no]
Teepleite (Y: 1939) 6.AC.40    (IUPAC: disodium chloro tetrahydroxyborate)
Tegengrenite (spinel, spinel: IMA1999-002) 4.BB.20   [no] (IUPAC: dimagnesium (tin,manganese) tetraoxide)
Teineite (tellurite: 1939) 4.JM.20    (IUPAC: copper(II) trioxotellurate(IV) dihydrate)
Telargpalite (IMA1972-030) 2.BC.45    (IUPAC: tri(palladium,silver) telluride)
Tellurantimony (tetradymite: IMA1972-002) 2.DC.05    (IUPAC: diantimony tritelluride)
Tellurite (Y: 1845) 4.DE.20    (IUPAC: tellurium(IV) oxide)
Tellurium (element: 1782) 1.CC.10   
Tellurobismuthite (tetradymite: 1863) 2.DC.05    (IUPAC: dibismuth tritelluride)
Tellurohauchecornite (hauchecornite: IMA78-G) 2.BB.10    (IUPAC: nonanickel bismuth telluride octasulfide)
Telluromandarinoite (tellurite: IMA2011-013) 4.JM.  [no] [no] (IUPAC: diron(III) tri(trioxotellurate(IV)) hexahydrate) 
Telluronevskite (tetradymite: IMA1993-027a) 2.DC.05    (IUPAC: tribismuth telluride diselenide)
Telluropalladinite (IMA1978-078) 2.BC.30    (IUPAC: nonapalladium tetratelluride)
Telluroperite (nadorite: IMA2009-044) 3.0  [no] [no] (IUPAC: dilead (tellurium lead) tetraoxodichloride)
Telyushenkoite (leifite: IMA2001-012) 9.EH.25   [no]
Temagamite (IMA1973-018) 2.BC.50    (IUPAC: tripalladium mercury tritelluride)
Tengchongite (IMA1984-031) 7.HB.20    (IUPAC: calcium hexauranyl pentaoxo dimolybdate dodecahydrate)
Tengerite-(Y) (tengerite: IMA1993 s.p., 1838 Rd) 5.CC.10    (IUPAC: diyttrium tricarbonate (2-3)hydrate)
Tennantite (tetrahedrite, tennantite) 2.GB.05
Tennantite-(Cd) (IMA2021-083) 2.GB.05
Tennantite-(Cu) (IMA2020-096) 2.GB.05  [no] [no]
Tennantite-(Fe) (IMA18-K, 1819) 2.GB.05   
Tennantite-(Hg) (IMA2020-063) 2.GB.05  [no] [no]
Tennantite-(Mn) (IMA2022-040) 2.GB.05  [no] [no]
Tennantite-(Ni) (IMA2021-018) 2.GB.05  [no] [no]
Tennantite-(Zn) (IMA18-K, 1819) 2.GB.05   
Tenorite (IMA1962 s.p., 1842) 4.AB.10    (IUPAC: copper(II) oxide)
Tephroite (olivine: 1823) 9.AC.05    (IUPAC: dimanganese(II) tetraoxysilicate)
Terlinguacreekite (IMA2004-018) 3.DD.55    (IUPAC: trimercury(II) dioxodichloride)
Terlinguaite (Y: 1900) 3.DD.20    (IUPAC: dimercury oxochloride)
Ternesite (IMA1995-015) 9.AH.20   [no] (IUPAC: pentacalcium di(tetraoxysilicate) sulfate)
Ternovite (IMA1992-044) 4.FM.15   
Terranovaite (zeolitic tectosilicate: IMA1995-026) 9.GF.05   [no]
Terrywallaceite (lillianite: IMA2011-017) 2.0  [no] [no] (IUPAC: silver lead hexasulfa tri(antimonide,bismuthide)
Terskite (IMA1982-039) 9.DM.40   
TertschiteQ (Y: 1953) 6.EB.20   
Teruggite (IMA1968-007) 6.FA.25    (IUPAC: tetracalcium magnesium di[arsenic undecaoxohexahydrohexaborate] tetradecahydrate)
Teschemacherite (Y: 1868) 5.AA.25    (IUPAC: ammonium bicarbonate)
TestibiopalladiteN (Y: 1991) 2.EB.25   
Tetra-auricupride (alloy: IMA1982-005) 1.AA.10b    (IUPAC: copper gold alloy)
Tetradymite (tetradymite: 1831) 2.DC.05    (IUPAC: dibismuth ditelluride sulfide)
Tetraferriannite (mica: IMA1998 s.p., 1925) 9.EC.20   [no] (IUPAC: potassium triiron(II) (iron(III) trisilicate) decaoxy dihydroxyl)
Tetraferriphlogopite (mica: IMA1998 s.p., 1925) 9.EC.20   [no] (IUPAC: potassium trimagnesium (iron(III) trisilicate) decaoxy dihydroxyl)
Tetraferroplatinum (alloy: IMA1974-012a) 1.AG.40    (IUPAC: platinum iron alloy)
Tetrahedrite (tetrahedrite, tetrahedrite) 2.GB.05
Tetrahedrite-(Fe) (IMA18-K, IMA1962 s.p., 1845) 2.GB.05   
Tetrahedrite-(Hg) (IMA2019-003) 2.GB.  [no] [no]
Tetrahedrite-(Mn) (IMA2021-098) 2.GB   [no] [no] 
Tetrahedrite-(Ni) (IMA2021-031) 2.GB.  [no] [no]
Tetrahedrite-(Zn) (IMA18-K, IMA1962 s.p., 1845) 2.GB.05   
Tetrarooseveltite (scheelite: IMA1993-006) 8.AD.55    (IUPAC: bismuth arsenate)
Tetrataenite (alloy: IMA1979-076) 1.AE.10    (IUPAC: iron nickel alloy)
Tetrawickmanite (stottite: IMA1971-018) 4.FC.15    (IUPAC: manganese(II) tin(IV) hexahydroxide)
Tewite (IMA2014-053) 4.0  [no] [no] (IUPAC: tetrapotassium tetra(tritellurium,vacancy) decatungsten octatriacontaoxide)

Th – Tl 
Thadeuite (IMA1978-001) 8.BH.05    (IUPAC: calcium trimagnesium di(hydro,fluoro) diphosphate)
Thalcusite (IMA1975-023) 2.BD.30    (IUPAC: tetra(copper,iron) dithallium tetrasulfide)
Thalénite-(Y) (IMA1987 s.p., 1898) 9.BJ.20    (IUPAC: triyttrium decaoxotrisilicate fluoride)
Thalfenisite (djerfisherite: IMA1979-018) 2.FC.05   
Thalhammerite (IMA2017-111) 2.0  [no] [no]
Thalliomelane (hollandite, coronadite: IMA2019-055) 4.0  [no] [no]
Thalliumpharmacosiderite (pharmacosiderite: IMA2013-124) 8.0  [no] [no] (IUPAC: thallium tetrairon [tetrahydro triarsenate] tetrahydrate)
Thaumasite (ettringite: 1878) 7.DG.15    (IUPAC: tricalcium silicon hexahydro carbonate sulfate dodecahydrate)
Thebaite-(NH4) (IMA2020-072) 10.0  [no] [no]
Theisite (IMA1980-040) 8.BE.75    (IUPAC: pentacopper pentazinc tetradecahydro diarsenate)
Thénardite (Y: 1826) 7.AC.25    (IUPAC: anhydrous disodium sulfate)
Theoparacelsite (IMA1998-012) 8.BB.65    (IUPAC: tricopper dihydro pyroarsenate)
Theophrastite (brucite: IMA1980-059) 4.FE.05    (IUPAC: nickel(II) dihydroxide)
Therasiaite (IMA2013-050) 7.0  [no] [no] (IUPAC: triammonium potassium disodium iron(II) iron(III) pentachloro trisulfate)
Thérèsemagnanite (ktenasite: IMA15-K, IMA1991-026) 7.DD.80    (IUPAC: sodium tetracobalt chloro sulfate hexahydroxide hexahydrate)
Thermaerogenite (spinel: IMA2018-021) 4.BB.  [no] [no]
Thermessaite 3.CG.25 (IUPAC: di[cation(I)] trifluoroaluminate sulfate)
Thermessaite (IMA2007-030) 3.CG.25   
Thermessaite-(NH4) (IMA2011-077) 3.CG.25  [no] [no]
Thermonatrite (Y: 1845) 5.CB.05    (IUPAC: disodium carbonate monohydrate)
Thomasclarkite-(Y) (IMA1997-047) 5.DC.20    (IUPAC: sodium yttrium trihydro bicarbonate tetrahydrate)
Thometzekite (tsumcorite: IMA1982-103) 8.CG.15    (IUPAC: lead dicopper(II) diarsenate dihydrate)
Thomsenolite (Y: 1868) 3.CB.40    (IUPAC: sodium calcium hexafluoroaluminate monohydrate)
Thomsonite (zeolitic tectosilicate) 9.GA.10 (IUPAC: sodium di(metal) (pentalumino pentasilicate) icosaoxy hexahydrate)
Thomsonite-Ca (IMA1997 s.p., 1820) 9.GA.10   
Thomsonite-Sr (IMA2000-025) 9.GA.10   [no]
Thorasphite (IMA2017-085) 8.0  [no] [no]
Thorbastnäsite (bastnäsite: IMA1968 s.p., 1965) 5.BD.20a    (IUPAC: thorium calcium difluoro dicarbonate trihydrate)
Thoreaulite (Y: 1933) 4.DG.15    (IUPAC: tin(II) ditantalum hexaoxide)
Thorianite (fluorite: 1904) 4.DL.05    (IUPAC: thorium dioxide)
Thorikosite (IMA1984-013) 3.DC.40    (IUPAC: trilead trioxide antimony(III) hydro dichloride)
Thorite (zircon: 1817) 9.AD.30    (IUPAC: thorium tetraoxosilicate)
Thornasite (tectosilicate zeolite: IMA1985-050) 9.GF.50    (IUPAC: dodecasodium trithorium tetra(nonadecaoxoctasilicate) octahydrate)
Thorneite (tellurium oxysalt: IMA2009-023) 7.0  [no] [no]
Thorosteenstrupine (IMA1967 s.p., 1962) 9.CK.20    (IUPAC: tri(calcium,thorium,manganese) undecaoxotetrasilicate fluoride hexahydrate)
Thortveitite (thortveitite: 1911) 9.BC.05    (IUPAC: discandium heptaoxodisilicate)
Thorutite (brannerite: 1958) 4.DH.05    (IUPAC: (thorium,uranium,calcium) dititanium hexa(oxide,hydroxide))
Threadgoldite (IMA1978-066) 8.EB.20    (IUPAC: aluminium diuranyl hydro diphosphate octahydrate)
Thunderbayite (IMA2020-042)  [no] [no]
Tiberiobardiite (chalcophyllite: IMA2016-096) 9.0  [no] [no]
Tiemannite (sphalerite: 1855) 2.CB.05a    (IUPAC: mercury selenide)
Tienshanite (IMA1967-028) 9.CL.05   
Tiettaite (IMA1991-013) 9.HA.90   
Tikhonenkovite (IMA1967 s.p., 1964) 3.CC.10    (IUPAC: strontium hydro tetrafluoroaluminate monohydrate)
Tilasite (titanite: 1895) 8.BH.10    (IUPAC: calcium magnesium fluoro arsenate)
Tilkerodeite (IMA2019-111) 2.0  [no] [no] (IUPAC: dipalladium mercury triselenide)
Tilleyite (Y: 1933) 9.BE.82    (IUPAC: pentacalcium heptaoxodisilicate dicarbonate)
Tillmannsite (IMA2001-010) 8.AC.80   [no] (IUPAC: mercury trisilver vanadate)
Timroseite (tellurium oxysalt: IMA2009-064) 4.0  [no] [no] (IUPAC: dilead pentacopper dihydro di(hexaoxtellurate(VI)))
Tin (element: old) 1.AC.10   
Tinaksite (IMA1968 s.p., 1965) 9.DG.75    (IUPAC: dipotassium sodium dicalcium titanium octadecaoxy heptasilicate oxyhydroxyl)
Tincalconite (Y: 1878) 6.DA.15    (IUPAC: disodium tetrahydro pentaoxotetraborate trihydrate)
Tinnunculite (IMA2015-021a) 10.0  [no] [no] (IUPAC: dihydrate of uric acid)
Tinsleyite (IMA1983-004) 8.DH.10    (IUPAC: potassium dialuminium hydro diphosphate dihydrate)
Tinticite (Y: 1946) 8.DC.32    (IUPAC: triiron(III) trihydroxide diphosphate trihydrate)
Tintinaite (kobellite: IMA1967-010) 2.HB.10a    (Pb10Cu2Sb16S35)
Tinzenite (axinite: IMA1968 s.p., 1923 Rd) 9.BD.20    (IUPAC: dicalcium tetramanganese(II) tetraluminium [diboron triacontaoxoctasilicate] dihydroxyl)
Tiptopite (cancrinite: IMA1983-007) 8.DA.25   
Tiragalloite (IMA1979-061) 9.BJ.25    (IUPAC: tetramanganese(II) hydrogen tridecaoxoarsenotrisilicate)
Tischendorfite (IMA2001-061) 2.BC.65    (IUPAC: octapalladium trimercury nonaselenide)
Tisinalite (lovozerite: IMA1979-052) 9.CJ.15a    (IUPAC: trisodium manganese(II) trihydrogen titanium octadecaoxohexasilicate)
Tissintite (pyroxene: IMA2013-027) 9.DA.  [no] [no] (IUPAC: (calcium,sodium,vacancy) aluminohexaoxodisilicate)
Tistarite (corundum: IMA2008-016) 4.CB.05   [no] (IUPAC: dititanium trioxide)
Titanite (titanite: IMA1967 s.p., 1795) 9.AG.15    (IUPAC: calcium titanium oxide tetraoxosilicate)
Titanium (element: IMA2010-044) 1.AB.05  [no] [no]
Titanoholtite (dumortierite: IMA2012-069) 9.A?.  [no] [no]
TitanomaghemiteQ (Y: 1953) 4.BB.15  [no] [no] (IUPAC: iron di(iron,titanium) tetraoxide)
Titanowodginite (wodginite: IMA1984-008) 4.DB.40    (IUPAC: manganese(II) titanium ditantalum octaoxide)
Titantaramellite (IMA1977-046) 9.CE.20   
Tivanite (IMA1980-035) 4.DB.45    (IUPAC: titanium vanadium(III) hydro trioxide)
Tlalocite (tellurite-tellurium oxysalt: IMA1974-047) 7.DE.20    (IUPAC: decacopper hexazinc pentaicosahydrate trioxotellurate(IV) chloro di(tetraoxotellurate(VI)) heptaicosahydrate)
Tlapallite (tellurite-tellurium oxysalt: IMA1977-044) 4.JL.25    (IUPAC: hexahydrogen di(calcium,lead) tri(copper,zinc) dioxo sulfate tetra(trioxotellurate(IV)) tetraoxotellurate(VI))

To – Ty 
Tobelite (mica: IMA1981-021) 9.EC.15    (IUPAC: ammonium dialuminium (aluminotrisilicate) decaoxy dihydroxyl)
Tobermorite (tobermorite: IMA2014 s.p., 1882) 9.DG.10   
Tochilinite (IMA1971-002) 2.FD.35   
TocornaliteQ (Y: 1867) 3.AA.10  [none]  (?)
Todorokite (IMA1962 s.p., 1934) 4.DK.10   
Tokkoite (IMA1985-009) 9.DG.75    (IUPAC: dipotassium tetracalcium octadecaoxy heptasilicate hydroxyl fluoride)
Tokyoite (brackebuschite: IMA2003-036) 8.BG.05    (IUPAC: dibarium manganese(III) hydro divanadate)
Tolbachite (IMA1982-067) 3.AB.05    (IUPAC: copper dichloride)
Tolovkite (cobaltite: IMA1980-055) 2.EB.25    (IUPAC: iridium sulfantimonide)
Tolstykhite (IMA2022-007) 2.CB.  [no] [no]
Tomamaeite (alloy: IMA2019-129) 1.0  [no] [no] (IUPAC: tricopper platinum alloy)
Tombstoneite (IMA2021-053) 4.JN.  [no] [no]
Tomichite (IMA1978-074) 4.JB.55    (IUPAC: tetravanadium(III) trititanium(IV) arsenic(III) hydro tridecaoxide)
Tomiolloite (IMA2021-019)  [no] [no]
Tondiite (atacamite: IMA2013-077) 3.0  [no]  (IUPAC: tricopper magnesium hexahydro dichloride)
Tongbaite (carbide: IMA1982-003) 1.BA.15    (IUPAC: trichromium dicarbide)
Tooeleite (IMA1990-010) 4.JD.15    (IUPAC: hexairon(III) tetra(trioxoarsenate) tetrahydro sulfate tetrahydrate)
Topaz (Y: 1737) 9.AF.35    (IUPAC: dialuminiium tetraoxosilicate difluorine)
Topsøeite (IMA2016-113) 3.0  [no] [no] (IUPAC: iron trifluoride triwater)
Torbernite (IMA1980 s.p., 1790) 8.EB.05    (IUPAC: copper diuranyl diphosphate dodecahydrate)
Törnebohmite (fornacite) 9.AG.45 (IUPAC: diREE aluminium di(tetrasilicate) hydroxyl)
Törnebohmite-(Ce) (IMA1966 s.p., 1921) 9.AG.45    
Törnebohmite-(La) (IMA1966 s.p., 1921) 9.AG.45   
Törnroosite (isomertieite: IMA2010-043) 2.0  [no] [no] (Pd11As2Te2) 
Torrecillasite (IMA2013-112) 4.0  [no]  (IUPAC: sodium tetra(arsenic(III),antimony(III)) chloro hexaoxide)
Torreyite (Y: 1949) 7.DD.40    (IUPAC: nonamagnesium tetrazinc docosahydro disulfate octahydrate)
Torryweiserite (IMA2020-048) 2.0  [no] [no]
Tosudite (corrensite: 1963) 9.EC.60    A 1:1 regular interstratification of a chlorite group mineral and a smectite group mineral.
Toturite (garnet: IMA2009-033) 9.AD.25  [no] [no] (IUPAC: tricalcium ditin (diiron(III) silicate) dodecaoxy)
Tounkite (cancrinite-sodalite: IMA1990-009) 9.FB.05   
Townendite (lovozerite: IMA2009-066) 9.CJ.  [no] [no] (IUPAC: octasodium zirconium octadecaoxohexasilicate)
Toyohaite (IMA1989-007) 2.DA.10    (IUPAC: disilver iron tritin octasulfide)
Trabzonite (IMA1983-071a) 9.BJ.15    (IUPAC: tetracalcium [nonaoxotrisilicate hydroxyl] hydroxyl)
Tranquillityite (braunite: IMA1971-013) 9.AG.90    (IUPAC: octairon(II) trititanium dizirconium tetraicosaoxotrisilicate)
Transjordanite (barringerite: IMA2013-106) 1.0  [no] [no] (IUPAC: dinickel phosphide)
Traskite (IMA1964-014) 9.CP.05   
Trattnerite (milarite: IMA2002-002) 9.CM.05   
Treasurite (lillianite: IMA1976-008) 2.JB.40a    (Ag7Pb6Bi15S30)
Trébeurdenite (hydrotalcite: IMA2012 s.p.) 4.FL.  [no] [no] (IUPAC: diiron(II) tetrairon(III) dioxodecahydroxide carbonate trihydrate, Fe2+:Fe3+ = 1:2)
Trebiskyite (IMA2019-131) 4.0  [no] [no]
Trechmannite (Y: 1905) 2.GC.35    (IUPAC: silver disulfarsenide)
Tredouxite (tapiolite: IMA2017-061) 4.0  [no] [no] (IUPAC: nickel diantimony hexaoxide)
Trembathite (boracite: IMA1991-018) 6.GA.10    (IUPAC: trimagnesium chloro tridecaoxoheptaborate)
Tremolite [Ca-amphibole: IMA2012 s.p., IMA1997 s.p., 1789] 9.DE.10   
Trevorite (spinel, spinel: 1921) 4.BB.05    (IUPAC: nickel diiron(III) tetraoxide)
Triangulite (IMA1981-056) 8.EB.45    (IUPAC: trialuminium tetrauranyl pentahydro tetraphosphate pentahydrate)
Triazolite (triazolate: IMA2017-025) 10.0  [no] [no]
Tridymite (Y: 1868) 4.DA.10    (IUPAC: dioxosilicate)
Trigonite (Y: 1920) 4.JB.40    (IUPAC: trilead manganese(II) di(trioxoarsenate(III)) hydrodioxoarsenate(III))
Trikalsilite (feldspathoid, nepheline: 1957) 9.FA.05    (IUPAC: dipotassium sodium trialuminium tri(tetraoxosilicate))
Trilithionite (mica: IMA1998 s.p. Rd) 9.EC.20   [no] (IUPAC: dipotassium trilithium trialuminium (dialuminohexasilicate) icosaoxy tetrafluorine)
Trimerite (beryllonite: 1891) 9.AB.05    (IUPAC: calcium triberyllium dimanganese(II) tri(tetraoxosilicate))
Trimounsite-(Y) (IMA1989-042) 9.AG.25    (IUPAC: diyttrium dititanium nonaoxosilicate)
Trinepheline (IMA2012-024) 9.A?.  [no]  (IUPAC: sodium aluminium tetraoxosilicate)
Triphylite (olivine: 1834) 8.AB.10    (IUPAC: lithium iron(II) phosphate)
Triplite (Y: 1813) 8.BB.10    (IUPAC: di(manganese(II),iron(II)) fluoro phosphate)
Triploidite (wagnerite: 1878) 8.BB.15    (IUPAC: dimanganese(II) hydro phosphate)
Trippkeite (trippkeite: 1880) 4.JA.20    (IUPAC: copper(II) diarsenic(III) tetraoxide)
Tripuhyite (rutile: IMA2002 s.p., IMA1987-022 Rd) 4.DB.05    (IUPAC: iron(III) antimony(V) tetraoxide)
Tristramite (rhabdophane: IMA1982-037) 8.CJ.45   
Tritomite (apatite, britholite) 9.AH.25
Tritomite-(Ce) (IMA1987 s.p.) 9.AH.25   
Tritomite-(Y) (IMA1966 s.p., 1961) 9.AH.25   
Trögerite (natroautunite: 1871) 8.EB.15    (IUPAC: hydronium uranyl arsenate trihydrate)
Trogtalite (pyrite: 1955) 2.EB.05a    (IUPAC: cobalt diselenide)
Troilite (Y: 1863) 2.CC.10    (IUPAC: iron sulfide)
Trolleite (Y: 1868) 8.BB.45    (IUPAC: tetraluminium trihydro triphosphate)
Trona (Y: 1747) 5.CB.15    (IUPAC: trisodium bicarbonate carbonate dihydrate)
Truscottite (gyrolite: 1914) 9.EE.35   
Trüstedtite (spinel, linnaeite: IMA1967 s.p., 1964) 2.DA.05    (IUPAC: nickel(II) dinickel(III) tetraselenide)
Tsangpoite (IMA2014-110) 8.0  [no] [no] (IUPAC: pentacalcium diphosphate tetraoxosilicate)
Tsaregorodtsevite (sodalite: IMA1991-042) 9.FB.10    (IUPAC: tetramethylammonium tetrasilicon (aluminosilicate) dodecaoxide)
Tschaunerite (spinel: IMA2017-032a) 4.0  [no] [no]
Tschermakite [Ca-amphibole: IMA2012 s.p., IMA1997 s.p., 1945] 9.DE.10   
Tschermigite (alum: 1832) 7.CC.20    (IUPAC: ammonium aluminium disulfate dodecahydrate)
Tschernichite (zeolitic tectosilicate: IMA1989-037) 9.GF.30   
Tschörtnerite (zeolitic tectosilicate: IMA1995-051) 9.GF.40   [no]
Tsepinite (labuntsovite) 9.CE.30b
Tsepinite-Ca (IMA2002-020) 9.CE.30b   [no]
Tsepinite-K (IMA2002-005) 9.CE.30b   [no]
Tsepinite-Na (IMA2000-046) 9.CE.30b   [no]
Tsepinite-Sr (IMA2004-008) 9.CE.30b   [no]
Tsikourasite (phosphide: IMA2018-156) 1.0  [no] [no]
Tsilaisite (tourmaline: IMA2011-047) 9.CK.  [no] [no]
Tsnigriite (IMA1991-051) 2.LA.55    (IUPAC: nonasilver antimony tritelluride tri(sulfide,selenide))
Tsugaruite (IMA1997-010) 2.JB.30c   [no] (IUPAC: tetralead heptasulfadiarsenide)
Tsumcorite (tsumcorite: IMA1969-047) 8.CG.15    (IUPAC: lead dizinc diarsenate dihydrate)
Tsumebite (brackebuschite: 1912) 8.BG.05    (IUPAC: dilead copper hydro phosphate sulfate)
Tsumgallite ("O(OH)" group: IMA2002-011) 4.FD.10   [no] (IUPAC: hydrogallium oxide)
Tsumoite (tetradymite: IMA1972-010a) 2.DC.05    (IUPAC: bismuth telluride)
Tsygankoite (IMA2017-088) 2.0  [no] [no]
Tubulite (IMA2011-109) 2.JB.35f  [no]  (Ag2Pb22Sb20S53)
Tučekite (hauchecornite: IMA1975-022) 2.BB.10    (IUPAC: nonanickel octasulfadiantimonide)
Tugarinovite (rutile: IMA1979-072) 4.DB.05    (IUPAC: molybdenum(IV) oxide)
Tugtupite (sodalite: IMA1967 s.p., 1963) 9.FB.10    (IUPAC: tetrasodium beryllium dodecaoxotetrasilicate chlorine)
Tuhualite (tuhualite: 1932) 9.DN.05    (IUPAC: sodium iron(II) iron(III) pentadecaoxohexasilicate)
Tuite (palmierite: IMA2001-070) 8.AC.45   [no] (IUPAC: tricalcium diphosphate)
Tulameenite (alloy: IMA1972-016) 1.AG.40    (IUPAC: diplatinum copper iron alloy)
Tuliokite (IMA1988-041) 5.CB.50    (IUPAC: hexasodium barium thorium hexacarbonate hexahydrate)
Tululite (IMA2014-065) 4.0  [no] [no]
Tumchaite (IMA1999-041) 9.EA.60   [no] (IUPAC: disodium zirconium undecaoxotetrasilicate dihydrate)
Tundrite 09.AH.10 (IUPAC: disodium diREE titanium dioxy tetraoxosilicate dicarbonate)
Tundrite-(Ce) (IMA1968 s.p., 1965) 9.AH.10   
Tundrite-(Nd) (IMA1987 s.p., 1968) 9.AH.10   
Tunellite (IMA1967 s.p., 1961) 6.FC.05    (IUPAC: strontium dihydro nonaoxohexaborate trihydrate)
Tungsten (iron: IMA2011-004) 1.AE.05  [no] [no]
Tungstenite (molybdenite: 1917) 2.EA.30    (IUPAC: tungsten disulfide)
Tungstibite (IMA1993-059) 4.DE.15    (IUPAC: diantimony tungsten hexaoxide)
Tungstite (Y: 1868) 4.FJ.10    (IUPAC: tungsten trioxide monohydrate)
Tungusite (IMA1966-029) 9.EE.30   
Tunisite (IMA1967-038) 5.BB.15    (IUPAC: sodium dicalcium tetraluminium octahydro chloro tetracarbonate)
Tuperssuatsiaite (palygorskite: IMA1984-002) 9.EE.20   
Turanite (Y: 1909) 8.BB.70    (IUPAC: pentacopper(II) tetrahydro divanadate)
Turkestanite (steacyite: IMA1996-036) 9.CH.10   [no]
Turneaureite (apatite: IMA1983-063) 8.BN.05    (IUPAC: pentacalcium chloro triarsenate)
Turquoise (turquoise: IMA1967 s.p., old) 8.DD.15    (IUPAC: copper hexaluminium octahydro tetraphosphate tetrahydrate)
Turtmannite (hematolite: IMA2000-007) 8.BE.45   [no] (IUPAC: pentaicosamanganese pentaoxotrivanadate tri(tetraoxosilicate) icosahydroxyl)
Tuscanite (IMA1976-031) 9.EG.45   
Tusionite (IMA1982-090) 6.AA.15    (IUPAC: manganese(II) tin(IV) di(trioxoborate))
Tuzlaite (IMA1993-022) 6.EC.25    (IUPAC: sodium calcium dihydro octaoxopentaborate trihydrate)
Tvalchrelidzeite (IMA1974-052) 2.GC.45    (IUPAC: trimercury antimonide arsenide trisulfide)
Tvedalite (zeolitic tectosilicate: IMA1990-027) 9.DF.20   
Tveitite-(Y) (IMA1975-033) 03.AB.30   
Tvrdýite (beraunite: IMA2014-082) 8.0  [no] [no]
Tweddillite (epidote, clinozoisite: IMA2001-014) 9.BG.05   [no] (IUPAC: calcium strontium (dimanganese(III) aluminium) heptaoxodisilicate tetraoxosilicate oxydehydroxyl)
Twinnite (sartorite: IMA1966-017) 2.HC.05a   
Tychite (northupite: 1905) 5.BF.05    (IUPAC: hexasodium dimagnesium tetracarbonate sulfate)
Tyretskite (hilgardite: IMA1968 s.p.) 6.ED.05    (IUPAC: dicalcium hydro nonaoxopentaborate hydrate)
Tyrolite (Y: 1845) 8.DM.10    (IUPAC: dicalcium nonacopper octahydro tetrarsenate carbonate undecahydrate)
Tyrrellite (spinel, linnaeite: 1952) 2.DA.05    (IUPAC: copper di(cobalt,nickel) tetraselenide)
Tyuyamunite (Y: 1912) 4.HB.25    (IUPAC: calcium diuranyl divanadate (5-8)hydrate)

External links
IMA Database of Mineral Properties/ RRUFF Project
Mindat.org - The Mineral Database
Webmineral.com
Mineralatlas.eu minerals T